Code: 9 is a hidden camera/reality series that premiered on July 26, 2012 on Disney Channel. It is hosted by In the Qube star Wes Dening. The series involves a family pulling a prank with their unsuspecting parents. The entire group has to plan and execute the prank with one family member going undercover to pull the prank off. The series was not renewed for a second season, and was cancelled after only 1 season, despite encouraging opening ratings.

Episodes

Broadcast 
The series originally aired from July 26, 2012 to December 5, 2012 on Disney Channel and from November 19, 2012 to December 5, 2012 on Disney XD. It premiered on November 10, 2012 on Disney Channel (Australia and New Zealand), on January 4, 2013 on Disney Channel (Southeast Asia), and on January 12, 2013 on Disney Channel (UK and Ireland). The series was going to air on Family Channel but it was moved to Disney XD (Canada) on January 12, 2013.

References

External links 

 

2010s American comedy television series
2010s American reality television series
2012 American television series debuts
2012 American television series endings
2010s Australian comedy television series
2010s Australian reality television series
2012 Australian television series debuts
2012 Australian television series endings
American hidden camera television series
Disney Channel original programming
English-language television shows
Television series by Disney